Janne "Tempest" Suni is a Finnish demoscener, pixel artist and tracker musician, and a member of the demogroup Fairlight. He is best known outside the demoscene for being the creator of the song "Acidjazzed Evening", the melody of which hip-hop producer Timbaland plagiarized in the 2006 song "Do It" by Nelly Furtado (see Timbaland plagiarism controversy).  

"Acidjazzed Evening" originally won the oldskool music competition at the 2000 Assembly demoparty.

See also
 Timbaland plagiarism controversy

References

External links
Official website

Finnish male musicians
Tracker musicians
Demosceners
Living people
Year of birth missing (living people)